Bertignat (or ) is a commune in the Puy-de-Dôme department, region of Auvergne-Rhône-Alpes (formerly Auvergne), central France.

Geography
The commune is bordered along its eastern and northern limits by the river Dore, tributary of the Allier.

Localities
Babylone, le Bateau, les Batisses, Boisset, le Bost de Dore, Bourdelles, le Bourg, Boutonnargue, la Brugière, la Cambuse, le Chalet, Champandelay, le Chassagnon, le Chassaing, Chatelet, Chaussadis, les Claustres, la Collange Basse, le Champ, la Collange Haute, le Combas, le Combat, Conche, Conchette, la Côte de Sauvanis, la Croix du Bost de Dore, Dousson, Espinasse, la Faye, Flouvat, Fonlupt, le Fraisse, la Garde, la Goutte, Goutte-Clos, le Grand Bost, Grand Pré, la Grange, Lenteyras, Malfriat, Mariaux, Marioux, Meaux, le Mas, la Mayoux, Monteilhet, les Moulins, le Perrier, le Petit Bost, Pierre Grosse, Piessat, les Plaines, les Pommerettes, Pont de David (à cheval sur la commune de la Chapelle-Agnon), Pradis, le Prat, Pubrière, le Puy, Puybayou, la Ravanie, la Raze, les Rochades, la Roche, le Roule, le Rourre, Sagne Vert, Sauvanis, les Thuis,

Administration
Since 2014, the Mayor has been Jacques Pouget.

Population

Sights
The parish church was classified as a historic monument in 1987. Notable are: a wayside cross in stone from the sixteenth century; and stone alcove of baptismal fonts from the last quarter of the fifteenth century.

See also
Communes of the Puy-de-Dôme department

References

Communes of Puy-de-Dôme